Everything for the Woman (Hungarian: Mindent a nöért!) is a 1934 Hungarian comedy film directed by Béla Gaál and Géza von Cziffra and starring Jenö Herczeg, Vilmos Komlós and Gyula Kabos.

Cast
 Jenö Herczeg as Hacsek (segment Hacsek és Sajó mozikalandja) 
 Vilmos Komlós as Sajó (segment Hacsek és Sajó mozikalandja) 
 Gyula Kabos as Ladányi Ödön (segment Éjjel a patikában) 
 Ella Gombaszögi as Ladányiné (segment Éjjel a patikában) 
 Irén Ágay as Klárika, patikus kisasszony (segment Éjjel a patikában) 
 Lajos Ihász as Klárika võlegénye (segment Éjjel a patikában) 
 Ferenc Vendrey as Öreg beteg (segment Éjjel a patikában) 
 Tibor Halmay as Pincér (segment Jaj de jó szeretni!) 
 Lici Balla (segment Jaj de jó szeretni!) 
 György Dénes (segment Jaj de jó szeretni!) 
 Gyula Justh (segment Jaj de jó szeretni!) 
 S.Z. Sakall (segment A pampák királya)
 Elma Bulla
 Gyula Gózon (segment Éjjel a patikában) 
 Mici Haraszti (segment A pampák királya) 
 László Keleti (segment A pampák királya) 
 Livia Miklós
 Erzsi Palotai
 Sándor Pethes
 Sándor Peti (segment Éjjel a patikában) 
 Ernõ Szenes segment A pampák királya) 
 Lenke Szõnyi
 Gizi Sárosi
 Andor Sárossy
 Lajos Ujváry (segment Éjjel a patikában)

References

Bibliography
 Ferenc Lohr. Hallom a filmet. Magvető, 1989.

External links

1934 films
Hungarian comedy films
1930s Hungarian-language films
Films directed by Béla Gaál
Films directed by Géza von Cziffra
1934 comedy films
Hungarian black-and-white films